The Coeur d'Alene School District #271 (also known as Coeur d'Alene Public Schools) is a school district in Coeur d'Alene, Idaho.  District #271 serves a student population nearing 11,000 in Coeur d’Alene, Dalton Gardens, Hayden, Hayden Lake, and a portion of rural Kootenai County.  The district includes 17 schools: 11 elementary schools, 3 middle schools, 2 traditional high schools, and an alternative high school.   The school district also offer opportunities for students at a joint professional-technical high school campus (KTEC) shared by neighboring Lakeland and Post Falls school districts. District #271 is one of the largest employers in the five northernmost counties of Idaho, and ranks sixth in enrollment size among Idaho's 114 public school districts.

Budget
District #271 operates on a total budget of nearly $83 million, approximately $60 million of which is general fund.

Superintendent
Dr. Shon Hocker joined the District as Superintendent in July 2021.

Schools

High schools
Coeur d'Alene High School
Lake City High School

Middle schools
Canfield Middle School 
Lakes Middle School
Woodland Middle School

Elementary schools
Atlas Elementary School
Borah Elementary School
Bryan Elementary School
Dalton Elementary School
Hayden Meadows Elementary School
Northwest Expedition Academy 
Skyway Elementary School
Winton Elementary School

Specialty schools
Fernan STEM Academy
Kootenai Technical Education Campus – KTEC
Ramsey Magnet School of Science
Sorensen Magnet School of the Arts and Humanities
Venture High School

References

External links

School districts in Idaho
Coeur d'Alene, Idaho
Education in Kootenai County, Idaho